Zsadány is a village in Békés county, in the Southern Great Plain region of south-east Hungary.

Geography
It covers an area of 27.44 km² and has a population of 1807 people (2001).

Populated places in Békés County